The Men's double short metric round tetraplegic was an archery competition at the 1984 Summer Paralympics.

The Swedish archer Kenneth Holm won the gold medal unopposed.

Results

References

1984 Summer Paralympics events